The Speed of Change is the second album by Loose Assembly, a quintet led by American jazz drummer Mike Reed featuring alto saxophonist Greg Ward, vibraphonist Jason Adasiewicz, cellist Tomeka Reid and bassist Josh Abrams. It was recorded in 2007 and released on 482 Music.

Reception

The Down Beat review by Bill Meyer states "You can find elements from throughout the AACM’s history on the quintet’s second album, from Roscoe Mitchell’s distillations of pure sound to Nicole Mitchell’s widescreen, pan-generic orchestrations; but that’s simply foundation."

In a review for All About Jazz, Troy Collins says "A compelling album filled with myriad moods, The Speed of Change is a welcome reminder of the rich variety a capable composer can draw from an unorthodox instrumental line-up."

Track listing
All compositions by Mike Reed except as indicated
 "The Speed of Change" – 7:26
 "Garvey's Ghost" (Max Roach) – 4:41
 "Ground Swell" (Loose Assembly) – 3:22
 "Tezetaye Antchi Lidj" (Mulatu Astatke) – 7:17
 "X" (Adasiewicz, Ward) – 4:04
 "Soul Stirrer" – 6:40
 "Exit Strategy" – 6:41
 "Picking Up Greta" – 2:26

Personnel
Greg Ward – alto sax
Tomeka Reid – cello 
Jason Adasiewicz - vibraphone
Josh Abrams – bass
Mike Reed – drums, percussion
Nicole Mitchell – voice on 2, flute and voice on 8

References

2008 albums
Mike Reed (musician) albums